Allerbach is a river of Saxony-Anhalt, Germany.

The Allerbach springs west of Trautenstein. It is a left tributary of the Rappbode through the Rappbode Auxiliary Dam north of Trautenstein.

See also
List of rivers of Saxony-Anhalt

References

Rivers of Saxony-Anhalt
Rivers of Germany